In Norway, impeachment, also known as the Constitutional Court of the Realm, is a judicial process with the power to convict Members of Parliament, Members of the Council of State, and Supreme Court Justices for criminal acts performed in line of duty. Impeachment is based on the Constitution of Norway §§ 86 and 87. Parliament authorizes the impeachment process, which establishes a tribunal consisting of five members of the Supreme Court and six lay members appointed by the Parliament of Norway. Impeachment has been used eight times, the last case being held in 1927.

History
Impeachment has been performed eight times in the history of the kingdom, and each time it has been aimed at members of the government. Six of the cases were in the period 1814–45. During the constitutional struggle in the last half of the 19th century impeachment became vital following the case against Selmer's Cabinet in 1883 and 1884, concerning the veto rights of the King in matters of the constitution. Prior to this case, impeachment was the only way for parliament to dismiss a member of the cabinet; after 1884 Norway got a system of parliamentarism, and parliament could dismiss a member of cabinet through a majority vote.

After the constitutional battle of 1884 was over, there was only one case, where Prime Minister Abraham Berge and six members of his cabinet were found not guilty in 1927. Since then impeachment has not been used, and is no longer considered part of the political game. Public commissions have since looked at reforming or removing impeachment, and transferring the institution to the ordinary courts. On 20 February 2007 the parliament voted to change the constitution such that the organization of impeachment becomes more potent, and changing the requirements so the lay members of the court are not current members of parliament.

Cases
There have been eight cases of impeachment:

Structure
Prior to the 2007 constitution change, the Odelsting chamber was to act as prosecutor and the Lagting chamber along with the supreme court was to act as the court. Ten members of the Lagting and five from the supreme court were to rule in the matter.

The constitutional change merged the two chambers, causing the process of impeachment also to be changed. The court would consist of eleven members, five from the supreme court and six lay members chosen by parliament for a period of six years. Current members of parliament are not eligible  to serve, as they are presumed to have a conflict of interest in the matter. The Chief Justice of the Supreme Court is to lead the impeachment. The responsibility to act as prosecutor is held by the parliament, and is to be administrated by a parliamentary committee, Stortingets ansvarskommisjon. The changes made impeachment a more viable threat to office holders should they breach their limitations.

References

Judiciary of Norway
Norway
Government of Norway